The Priory Church of St Mary and St Hardulph is the Church of England parish church of Breedon on the Hill, Leicestershire, England. The church has also been known as Breedon Priory and as the Holy Hill Monastery.

The church was founded as a monastery in the 7th century, and contains the largest collection, and some of the finest examples, of Anglo-Saxon sculptures. It also contains a notable family pew and Renaissance-era church monuments to the Shirley family, who bought the manor of Breedon after it was surrendered to the Crown in 1539 during the Dissolution of the Monasteries. The largest of these monuments is for Sir George Shirley. It was made over 20 years before his death and includes a life-sized skeleton carved in alabaster.

The church stands on the top of Breedon Hill, within the remains of an Iron Age hill fort called The Bulwarks. The hill is flanked to the south by the 400 houses of Breedon on the Hill village, and encroached on the east by Breedon Quarry. Breedon church is a nationally important building, with a Grade I listing for its exceptional architectural interest.

History

Holy Hill Monastery
The church was founded as a monastery in about 676 on the site of the Bulwarks hill fort and a hermitage. The church was founded by Æthelred of Mercia, third son of Penda of Mercia (who ruled until 706) according to the Anglo-Saxon Chronicle. The land was given by Friduricus with the stipulation that Headda would be made the abbot. Friduricus is a candidate for the four saints who are interred here, possibly in a now-buried crypt.

The hagiography of the Secgan Manuscript, On the Resting-Places of the Saints, records that the other three saints buried in Breedon-on-the-Hill are Anglo-Saxon saints Eardwulf of Northumbria, Beonna of Breedon and Cotta of Breedon.

Headda was to become a Bishop of Lichfield and later, in 731, the monastery trained Tatwine to be its abbot, a position he held until 794. Tatwine was known for his rhyming riddles and for his later ascension to be Archbishop of Canterbury. The lands that supported the monastery were added to by King Æthelred of Mercia. In 1066, the manor of Breedon was given by William the Conqueror to the de Ferrers family, who later became the Earls of Derby. The Domesday Book in 1086 records that Henry de Ferrers held Breedon.

Breedon Priory
Breedon priory was founded as an Augustinian monastery in around 1120, on the site of the earlier Saxon Benedictine abbey of Holy Hill Monastery. The priory was a cell of Nostell Priory in Yorkshire and there seems to have been between three and five canons in residence at any one time, usually from Nostell. Candidates for Prior were also usually selected by Nostell. Gervase, a prior of Breedon, attempted to gain independence for the priory from Nostell, but failed and subsequently resigned in 1244.

In 1441 a visit from William Alnwick, Bishop of Lincoln (Leicestershire was historically within the Diocese of Lincoln), found the monastery to be dilapidated and in debt. By 1535 there was no resident community at the priory, which was now occupied only by the prior. The Valor Ecclesiasticus of 1535 recorded the priory had an annual income, after expenses, of £24. 10s. 4d.

The priory was surrendered for dissolution in November 1539. It was later sold to Francis Shirley, head of the local manorial family, who were recusants. After the Dissolution, the eastern part of the priory with the formerly central tower was retained for parish use. The nave and other buildings were demolished.

Priors of Breedon Priory

Elias, occurred between 1153 and 1160. 
Thomas, occurred late 12th century. 
William, occurred about 1170–80. 
Ralph, occurred between 1175 and 1207.
Gervase, presented 1223, resigned 1244. 
Walter of Stokes, presented 1245. 
Thomas of Acomb, occurred 1288, died 1293. 
William Wyles, presented 1293, occurred 1299.
Robert of Pontefract, presented 1314, died 1324.
John de Insula, presented 1324, left after elected Prior of Nostell in 1328.
William Buttrebuske, presented 1328, occurred 1341.
Richard, occurred 1348. 
Adam, occurred 1384, elected Prior of Nostell, 1385. 
Robert of Qwyxlay, occurred before 1393.
Adam, presented, for the second time, 1393, died 1402. 
William of Altofts, presented 1402. (fn. 55) 
John Amyas, presented 1411. (fn. 56) 
William Horbury, presented 1422, occurred 1439.
James Byrtby, presented 1439, resigned 1449.
Stephen Melsymby, presented 1449.
William Yorke, presented 1450, died 1472. 
John Hyndrewell, presented 1472, died 1495. 
John Emley, presented 1495, died 1503.
Richard Bretaynger, presented 1503, died 1513.
John Brydell, presented 1513, died 1524.
Robert Harrop, presented 1524, occurred 1535. 
Thomas Clarke, occurred 1529 and 1536; died 1537.
Henry Huntingdon, presented 1537.

Later history
The church has been a Grade I listed building since 1962, which categorises it as a building of exceptional interest.

Inside the church

Anglo-Saxon carvings
The church contains a series of important Saxon relief sculpture, some of which may be amongst the earliest to survive in England. These carvings came from the original Saxon abbey church. They are not the earliest finds as neolithic artefacts have also been found on the hill.

Around the church are many early carvings which are frequently included as stones in the interior walls. However they are wrapped in lead sheet as though they are not intended to be structural. The carvings are dated to the 9th century and include Celtic patterns, lions, people, cocks and other birds that are pecking at vines.

Shirley monuments

The church contains many 16th and 17th century tombs of the Shirley family which bought the monastery site. There are two substantial tomb chests carved from Chellaston alabaster. The oldest chest tomb is for Francis Shirley and his wife. Around the chest are carved mourners arranged in pairs. This tomb is dated 1571. The other, similar tomb is for John Shirley and his wife, and is dated 1585. Both of these tombs were made by Richard and Gabriel Royley of Burton upon Trent.

The tomb of Sir Francis Shirley was repaired after 60 years by his great-grandson, Thomas Shirley. The latter recorded that even after 60 years, Francis' body was well preserved, with only a black mark apparent on one of his toes but with no sign of rot. His body was re-wrapped in material and returned to his tomb.

Three substantial tombs were constructed to memorialize Sir George Shirley, his father John, and his grandfather Thomas. By far the largest monument dominating the inside of the church is that dedicated to Sir George Shirley. It was made over 20 years before Shirley died in 1622. It is dated 1598 and consists of three storeys. On the bottom storey is a realistic skeleton carved from alabaster and showing the mortality of those portrayed above. The inclusion of this cadaver in the design was unusual for the time.

The second storey is supported on six pillars and the space is divided into two arched spaces. To the right and facing right in prayer is Sir George Shirley with his two sons behind him. All three figures are dressed in brightly painted period dress and the clothes include details in gold. In the left arch is his wife (d. 1595), daughter, and two babies. According to the Latin inscription, Shirley's wife died aged 29 whilst giving birth.

The third storey, again supported by six more pillars, is a canopy made in stone and incorporating a large, central, carved coat of arms. The monument was constructed from large blocks of alabaster. It was rebuilt in the 19th century by the stonemason Thomas Allt, who added his signature to the work.

Pews
The Shirley family pew was carved in 1627. The rest of the box pews date from the 18th century. The Shirley family pew now sits to the left of the main monument in the north aisle. In the past this wooden structure was said to be in the main body of the church. It is appropriate that it is now in the vaulted north aisle, as this entire aisle was in the separate ownership of the Shirley family until the 1950s.

Churchyard

The churchyard contains one war grave, of a soldier of the Machine Gun Corps of World War I.

St Hardulf
St Hardulf is thought to be Eardwulf of Northumbria. The connection has been made by several historians and is uncontroversial, but not certain. Supporting evidence comes from a 12th-century list of the burial places of saints compiled at Peterborough. This calls the Saint Hardulph to whom Breedon was dedicated "Hardulfus rex"—King Eardwulf—and states that he was buried at Breedon.

Church organisation
Breedon parish is in the Deanery of North West Leicestershire, the Diocese of Leicester and the Province of Canterbury. It is part of the Ashby and Breedon Team Ministry now renamed the Flagstaff Family of Churches which comprises the following churches:
St Mary the Virgin, Coleorton
St John's Chapel, Coleorton
St Matthew's Church, Worthington
St Helen's Church, Ashby-de-la-Zouch 
Holy Trinity, Ashby-de-la-Zouch 
All Saints Church, Isley Walton

See also
List of English abbeys, priories and friaries serving as parish churches

References

Cited texts

Church of England church buildings in Leicestershire
Grade I listed churches in Leicestershire
Monasteries dissolved under the English Reformation